Coffee pot is a cooking pot for making coffee. It may also refer to:

 Coffeepot (François-Thomas Germain)
 The Coffee Pot (Bedford, Pennsylvania)
 The Coffee Pot (Tasmania)
 The Coffee Pot (Roanoke, Virginia)
 The Coffee Pot (Winston-Salem, North Carolina)
 The "Coffee Pot" - Steam Motor Coach at the Pichi Richi Railway
 CGR 0-4-0ST 1881 Coffee Pot, South African locomotive
 Coffeepot Pass, mountain gap and footpath in Colorado

See also
 Karlsbad coffee pot
 Bayreuth coffee pot